Eusynthemis is a genus of dragonflies in the family Synthemistidae. 
They are commonly known as tigertails. Species of this genus are found mostly in Australia with one species, Eusynthemis frontalis, found in the Solomon Islands.

Species
The genus Eusynthemis includes these species:
Eusynthemis aurolineata  - variable tigertail
Eusynthemis barbarae  - Mount Lewis tigertail
Eusynthemis brevistyla  - small tigertail
Eusynthemis cooloola  - Cooloola tigertail
Eusynthemis deniseae  - Carnarvon tigertail
Eusynthemis frontalis 
Eusynthemis guttata  - southern tigertail
Eusynthemis netta  - pretty tigertail
Eusynthemis nigra  - black tigertail
Eusynthemis rentziana  - swift tigertail
Eusynthemis tenera  - rainforest tigertail
Eusynthemis tillyardi  - mountain tigertail
Eusynthemis ursa  - Barrington tigertail
Eusynthemis ursula  - beech tigertail
Eusynthemis virgula  - golden tigertail

References

Synthemistidae
Anisoptera genera
Odonata of Oceania
Odonata of Australia
Taxa named by Friedrich Förster
Insects described in 1903